Kim Hye-rin (김혜린) may refer to:
Kim Hye-rin (artist) (born 1962), South Korean manhwa artist
Kim Hae-lin (born 1995), South Korean figure skater
Kim Hye-rin (born 1995), South Korean badminton player
Kim Hye-rin (curler) (born 1999), South Korean curler